

The Bethlem Gallery is an art gallery in Beckenham, Bromley, England. It was established in 1997 to support and exhibit artists who are current or former patients of the South London and Maudsley NHS Foundation Trust. The gallery is housed in an Art Deco building shared with the Bethlem Museum of the Mind, with exhibits about the history of Bethlem Royal Hospital.

The small gallery team supports and encourages artists who may feel excluded from artistic endeavour otherwise. The gallery provides facilities for collaboration, experimentation, and skills exchange.

Quotation
 – Lee, Bethlem artist.

Studio
For long term patients, the art studio is a place to spend time away from the ward.

Available resources facilitate sculpture, painting, drawing, printmaking and screen printing, among others.

See also
 Bethlem Royal Hospital

References

External links
Bethlem Gallery website
Guardian Gallery Sample Images and text
Outsider Art Movement article from the Bromley Times
Raw Vision, Nuala Ernest, Issue 85, 2015

1997 establishments in England
Art galleries established in 1997
Art galleries in London
Buildings and structures in the London Borough of Bromley
Tourist attractions in the London Borough of Bromley